Zvonimir is a Croatian male given name, used since the Middle Ages.

the name was popular in the former Yugoslavia among the Croatian people because Dmitar Zvonimir was the Croatian king, who ruled from 1075 to 1089. remembered as one of the most successful rulers of early medieval Croatia, Zvonimir, like his predecessor Petar Krešimir IV, continued the policy of Croatian expansion in all fields. His death in 1089. was a turning point in Croatian history, because the succession crisis it caused was accompanied by a bloody war that resulted in the loss of Croatian independence.

People named Zvonimir 

Demetrius Zvonimir of Croatia, Croatian king
Zvonimir Berković, Croatian film director, teacher and critic
Zvonimir Boban, Croatian footballer
Zvonimir Cimermančić, Croatian footballer
Ferdinand Zvonimir von Habsburg, Austrian archduke
Zvonimir Janko, Croatian mathematician
Zvonimir Lončarić, Croatian artist
Zvonimir Rogoz, Croatian actor
Zvonimir Serdarušić, Croatian handball player
Zvonimir Levačić - Ševa, Croatian TV personality
Zvonimir Soldo, Croatian footballer
Zvonimir Šeparović, Croatian politician
Zvonimir Vukić, Serbian footballer

See also
 Slavic names

External links
 http://www.behindthename.com/name/zvonimir

Slavic masculine given names
Bosnian masculine given names
Croatian masculine given names
Montenegrin masculine given names
Slovene masculine given names
Serbian masculine given names
Masculine given names

hr:Zvonimir